Dr. D. D. Hooper House is a historic home located at Sylva, Jackson County, North Carolina. The house was built in 1906, and is a two-story, Queen Anne-style frame dwelling, with one-story wings. One of the wings contained Dr. Hooper's office and was added in the 1930s. The house has a hipped roof with asymmetrical lower cross gables.  The building houses the Jackson County Chamber of Commerce.

It was listed on the National Register of Historic Places in 2000.

References

External links
Jackson County Chamber of Commerce

Houses on the National Register of Historic Places in North Carolina
Queen Anne architecture in North Carolina
Houses completed in 1906
Houses in Jackson County, North Carolina
National Register of Historic Places in Jackson County, North Carolina
1906 establishments in North Carolina